This article details the history of the New Orleans Saints, an American football team in the NFL, which was organized in 1967 and is based in New Orleans, Louisiana.

1960s: Beginnings
The city of New Orleans was awarded an NFL franchise on November 1, 1966, thanks to a combination of local activism (most notably by David Dixon and by members of the local media, such as New Orleans States-Item sports editor Crozet Duplantier) and political force (Senator Russell Long and Congressman Hale Boggs, who made approval of the NFL-AFL merger conditional on the awarding of a franchise to New Orleans).

William G. Helis Jr., Herman Lay, John W. Mecom Jr., Louis J. Roussel Jr., Jack Sanders, and Edgar B. Stern Jr. were the six bidders for the franchise. On December 15, oilman Mecom became the majority shareholder and thus president of the team with his winning bid of $8.5 million; later that month, Tom Fears was named head coach.  The team was named "Saints" due to its birthday on the Roman Catholic Church's All Saints Day—a fitting nickname for a team in the largely Catholic New Orleans area. The name was announced on January 9, 1967. The team's original stadium was Tulane Stadium, which could seat more than 80,000 fans. The team was placed in the Capitol Division of the NFL's Eastern Conference; their division foes were the Dallas Cowboys, Philadelphia Eagles, and Washington Redskins.  The team started off well, with a 5–1 preseason record; then, on the first play of the 1967 regular season, wide receiver John Gilliam returned the opening kickoff 94 yards for a touchdown. However, this was not enough for the Saints, and they lost their regular season opener to the Los Angeles Rams, 13–27. Their first win came on November 5 as they defeated the Eagles 31–24. That would be one of the Saints' only triumphs in their inaugural campaign; they ended the season 3–11, the second-worst mark in the league and  games behind Washington in the divisional race. At the time, however, the Saints' three wins tied for the most ever for an expansion team's inaugural season.

Their next few seasons continued along similar lines. They improved slightly in 1968, putting up a 4–9–1 record as they competed in the Century Division against the Cleveland Browns, St. Louis Cardinals (NFL), and Pittsburgh Steelers; in 1969, they returned to the Capitol Division (featuring the same division opponents as 1967) and managed to go 5–9.

1970–1974

The 1970 season saw yet another realignment for the Saints due to the AFL–NFL merger. The Saints were placed in the NFC West, where they would remain through 2001. Their original NFC West competitors – the Atlanta Falcons, Los Angeles (and later, St. Louis) Rams, and San Francisco 49ers – would also remain in the division through 2001 (with the Carolina Panthers joining in 1995), leading to the development of long-standing rivalries.

The season started off poorly for the Saints. After going 1-5-1 in the first seven games, Fears was fired and replaced by J.D. Roberts on November 3. In Roberts' first game as coach, New Orleans trailed the Detroit Lions 17-16 with time winding down, but Tom Dempsey kicked an NFL-record 63-yard field goal as time expired to win the game. The record would stand through 2013 (43 years later), when Matt Prater of the Denver Broncos broke it with a 64-yard field goal. Dempsey's achievement is made all the more remarkable by the fact that he was born without toes on his right foot (which he kicked with). This Saints victory, however, would be the last for the season; they lost their last six games to finish 2-11-1, the worst record in the young history of the franchise.

In the 1971 NFL Draft, the Saints owned the second overall pick behind the Boston Patriots. Deciding that a franchise quarterback was necessary, they selected Archie Manning out of Mississippi. In the season opener, Manning did not disappoint; he passed for 218 yards and a touchdown and ran in another touchdown on the final play to give the Saints a 24-20 win over the Rams.  Four weeks later, Manning engineered a 24-14 upset of the Dallas Cowboys, the same team who would return to Tulane Stadium three months later and win Super Bowl VI over the Miami Dolphins. Throughout the season, Manning split the quarterbacking duties with veteran Edd Hargett. Manning ended the season with six passing touchdowns and four rushing touchdowns; he did well enough to become the team's undisputed starter the next season. Despite the promise Manning showed, the Saints' misfortunes continued as they finished 4-8-2. In 1972, the Saints started 0-5 and finished 2-11-1.  During the 1973 preseason, the Saints fired Roberts and hired John North, who led the Saints to consecutive 5-9 seasons in 1973 and 1974.

1975–1979
In 1975, the Saints moved from Tulane Stadium into the Louisiana Superdome. Despite the new home, they went just 2-12; North was fired after six games, and Ernie Hefferle was named interim head coach for the final eight games of the season.

For the 1976 season, Hank Stram was hired as head coach; he came with a proven track record (three AFL titles, one Super Bowl win) from his years with the Kansas City Chiefs (formerly the Dallas Texans). However, his talents proved ineffective in his first season, as the Saints went 4-10; Manning sat out the entire season after undergoing elbow surgery just after Stram's hiring, forcing the quarterback duties to be split by backup Bobby Scott and Chicago Bears castoff Bobby Douglass. 1977 was not much better as the Saints went 3-11, including a humiliating 33-14 loss to the Tampa Bay Buccaneers on December 11, the Buccaneers' first victory in the NFL after 26 consecutive losses.

In 1978, Stram was replaced by Dick Nolan. The season saw an improvement in the Saints' fortunes; Manning had the best season of his career up to that point, passing for 3,416 yards and 17 touchdowns. He was named to the NFC Pro Bowl squad for the first time and was also named the NFC's Most Valuable Player by The Sporting News and UPI. The Saints put together a record of 7-9, their best ever mark.  The Saints might have made the playoffs had it not had been for a pair of losses to the Atlanta Falcons, where the Falcons used the "Big Ben" play to score the winning touchdown in the final seconds of each contest, as well as a last-minute loss to the eventual Super Bowl XIII champion Pittsburgh Steelers.

In 1979, the Saints built on the success of the previous year.  After an 0-3 start (including a 40-34 overtime loss to the Falcons on opening day), the Saints won five of their next six games to take sole possession of the NFC West lead after nine games. The Saints were 7-6 heading into a Monday night game with the Oakland Raiders; their rivals for the NFC West title, the Rams, were 8-6. The Saints jumped out to a 35-14 lead and seemed certain to gain a share of first place with their win. But the Saints blew the lead and lost 42-35.  The next week, they were blown out 35-0 at the Superdome by the San Diego Chargers, ending their playoff hopes. The Saints, however, did manage to beat the Super Bowl-bound Rams (playing their last home game at the Los Angeles Memorial Coliseum until 2016) in the final game of the regular season. This gave them an 8-8 record, the first non-losing season in team history.  It was also the first time that the Saints finished higher than third place in their division.

1980–1985
In 1980, the Saints had high hopes after their two relatively successful seasons. Instead, the bottom fell out, where, despite a strong offense, their defense was almost nonexistent. The team started 0-12, and Dick Nolan was fired; he was replaced by Dick Stanfel, who lost two games (including one in San Francisco where the Saints blew a 28-point lead).  They managed to win against the New York Jets, who finished with the league's second worst record at 4-12, by a point. This game was also noteworthy for an episode where Archie Manning was signing autographs after the game. A boy ran up to him and stole his (unfastened) necktie, after which he was fined for violating the NFL's dress code. The Saints then lost their last game of the season to the New England Patriots to finish 1-15, the worst mark in team history and (at the time) the worst for a 16-game schedule, since eclipsed by the 2008 Detroit Lions and 2017 Cleveland Browns (0-16). A local journalist and radio/TV personality, Buddy Diliberto, wore a paper grocery bag over his head to promote the brown bag special of Sonic, the Saint's sponsor at the time. Many fans took to wearing bags over their heads when attending games. The moniker "Aints" was also born due to the ineptitude of the 1980 Saints.

In 1981, ex-Houston Oilers head coach Bum Phillips was hired as head coach and general manager. The dismal 1980 season meant that the Saints would get the first pick in the 1981 NFL Draft. They selected Heisman-winning running back George Rogers out of South Carolina, a move which in hindsight proved to be a huge blunder; the New York Giants, drafting second, selected future Hall of Fame linebacker Lawrence Taylor from North Carolina. Rogers was the team's workhorse, playing in all but one game and averaging more than 25 carries a game.  He ran for a total of 1,674 yards, making him the NFL rushing champion.  However, his fine performances were not enough to make the Saints a winning club.  They finished the season 4-12, but two of those wins came over the Rams, New Orleans' first regular-season sweep of the Rams since the two teams were placed in the NFC West by the AFL–NFL merger in 1970. The Saints also defeated the eventual AFC champion Cincinnati Bengals.

In 1982, the Saints signed former Oakland Raiders and Houston Oilers quarterback Ken Stabler and traded Archie Manning to the Oilers. Two games into the season, the Saints were 1-1, but a players' strike led to the cancellation of seven games.  When the season resumed, the Saints won two games in a row to take their record to 3-1, but they lost four games in a row before winning their last game, 35-6 over the Falcons. They finished 4-5, but missed out on qualifying for the playoffs (expanded to 16 teams due to the strike) on a tiebreaker.

1983 saw the Saints improve on the previous season once again. They hovered at or above .500 for most of the season, but lost a golden opportunity to stay one step ahead in the playoff race by giving up 17 points in the 4th quarter of a 31-28 loss to the New York Jets on Monday Night Football.  Their playoff hopes came down to the final game of the season, when they hosted the Rams. Los Angeles scored two touchdowns on interception returns and another on a punt return, and Mike Lansford kicked a 42-yard field goal with six seconds remaining to give the Rams the victory and a playoff berth, and end the Saints' season.  The Saints finished 8-8, tying their previous best season record.

Eight weeks after the conclusion of the 1983 season, the Saints traded their number one pick in the 1984 NFL Draft to the New York Jets for quarterback Richard Todd, who had worn out his welcome in the Big Apple by throwing too many interceptions, and was being phased out in favor of rookie Ken O'Brien. During the 1984 season, New Orleans traded for former Heisman Trophy winner and future Hall of Fame running back Earl Campbell, who won the NFL rushing championship in each of his first three seasons with the Oilers, when Bum Phillips coached the club. The Saints won for the first time on Monday Night Football by defeating the Pittsburgh Steelers in the Superdome, but a three-game losing streak late in the season dropped the Saints to 7-9.

The biggest news of the 1984 season was that John Mecom, the owner of the team for almost 20 years, was putting them up for sale. Speculation was rife that a new owner might move the Saints out of New Orleans, namely Jacksonville, Florida. But on May 31, 1985, negotiations were finalized to sell the team to Tom Benson, a native New Orleanian who owned numerous car dealerships throughout the New Orleans area. The team's future in New Orleans was safe for the time being.

In 1985, the Saints started off 3-2, but then lost six games in a row.  Bum Phillips resigned twelve games into the season, and his son Wade Phillips, the Saints' defensive coordinator, was named interim coach. The Saints ended the season 5-11.  A bright spot of the campaign was the emergence of quarterback and Louisiana native Bobby Hebert, who led the Saints to victories over the Vikings and Rams late in the season.  Hebert previously spent three seasons in the United States Football League with the Michigan Panthers and Oakland Invaders, leading the Panthers to the first USFL championship in 1983.

Jim Mora era (1986–1996)
Before the 1986 season, Saints owner Tom Benson put his stamp on the team by making two important hires: first, he named Jim Finks president and general manager; then, he named Jim Mora head coach. The Saints' offense struggled throughout the year after Bobby Hebert went down with a knee injury in the third game of the season, but behind a revitalized defense and NFC Rookie of the Year Rueben Mayes, New Orleans improved to 7-9.

The 1987 Saints started 1-1; then, another player strike followed. This time, however, replacement players were used until the regular players ended their strike. As a result, the season was only one game shorter than usual. The Saints went 2-1 with replacement players as they were led by their quarterback, New Orleans native John Fourcade. When the regular players returned, their first game was against the San Francisco 49ers.  The Saints lost 24-22, but that would be the last time they would taste defeat that year. They ran off a nine-game winning streak to close out the season — a remarkable feat considering that the Saints had never before won nine games in a season, let alone nine games in a row. The loss against San Francisco, however, would keep the Saints from being NFC West Champions; instead, the Saints finished 12-3, behind the 13-2 49ers, and had to settle for a wild-card spot in the playoffs despite having a better record than either of the other division champions that year. The Saints hosted the Minnesota Vikings on January 3, 1988; after 20 years, the Saints finally took part in the NFL playoffs. The game started well for the Saints as they took a 7-0 lead, but Minnesota answered by taking a 31-10 lead into halftime.  The Vikings added 13 more points in the second half to make the final score 44-10. Despite the loss, the Saints were recognized for their accomplishments; six players were selected for the Pro Bowl, and Mora and Finks were named NFL Coach and Executive of the Year, respectively.

The 1988 Saints looked to return to the playoffs.  After starting the season with a loss to their nemesis, the 49ers, the Saints bounced back with a seven-game win streak. After the streak, though, the Saints lost five of their next seven games.  They won their last game of the season, against Atlanta, but they missed out on the playoffs due to tiebreakers.

The 1989 Saints managed to finish 9-7, but thanks to other strong performances in the NFC, they missed the playoffs by two games.

In 1990, the Saints started off poorly, going 2-5 in their first seven games. However, they turned their season around and close wins in their final two games of the season were enough to give them an 8-8 record and a playoff berth in the newly expanded NFL playoffs, which now included six teams from each conference.  They traveled to Soldier Field to take on the Chicago Bears, but lost 16-6.

In 1991, the Saints started with a seven-game win streak, a team-record best start, and an overall impressive start, considering the Saints had never started better than 2-0. With the 7-0 start, the Saints opened up a four-game lead over the rest of the division.  But then the Saints lost five of their next seven games, giving Atlanta and San Francisco a shot at claiming the division title. However, the Saints regrouped in the final two games of the season, and they finished 11-5 as the Falcons and 49ers finished 10-6 to give the Saints their first-ever division title. The Saints' first-round playoff game would be at the Superdome against Atlanta.  The Falcons came from behind to defeat the Saints 27-20.

In 1992, the Saints attempted to defend their division title, but their hated rivals, the 49ers, swept the season series and finished 14-2 to the Saints' 12-4, meaning that the Saints would once again have to settle for a wild card berth to the NFC playoffs. They hosted the Philadelphia Eagles but once again could not put their home field advantage to good use, losing 36-20 for their fourth playoff loss in as many games.

The 1993 season would see the Saints start their decline from regular playoff contender to league doormat once again.  They started off 5-0, but lost eight of their last 11 games to finish 8-8, one game out of the playoffs.

After seven straight years without a losing record, the team returned to the losing ways of the pre-Mora era in 1994. The Saints started 4-8 on their way to a 7-9 record.

In 1995, the Saints again finished 7-9 in the NFC West, which was newly expanded to include the Carolina Panthers. Due to tiebreakers, the Saints had the disgrace of finishing in last place in the division behind even the expansion team.

In 1996, after the Saints started 2-6, Mora resigned after more than ten years with the franchise. He finished his Saints tenure with 93 wins and 78 losses, making him far and away the most successful Saints coach ever.  In fact, Mora was (up to then) the only coach ever to have a winning record during his Saints tenure, and his 93 wins were three more than the team had won in its entire history prior to his arrival. Rick Venturi was named interim head coach, but he had even less success than Mora did that season, going 1-7 to bring the Saints' final record to 3-13, their worst record since 1980.

Mike Ditka era (1997–1999)
Before the 1997 season, Tom Benson named legendary Chicago Bears head coach Mike Ditka as the Saints coach, leading to optimism that he would be able to win a Super Bowl with the Saints as he had done with the Bears. However, the Ditka era would be a tumultuous time for the organization.

In 1997, Ditka led the team to a 6-10 record, a three-game improvement from the previous season; the team was marked by strong defense (anchored by defensive end Joe Johnson, middle linebacker Winfred Tubbs, and veteran cornerback Eric Allen, among others) and inconsistent offense.

The 1998 season was even more chaotic.  Starting quarterback Billy Joe Hobert was lost for the year in the season-opening win against the St. Louis Rams. Later in the season, the team claimed quarterback Kerry Collins off the waiver wire; Collins had been released by the Carolina Panthers earlier in the season after he informed the team his heart wasn't in the game anymore.  Collins was inconsistent as a starter, including a 31-17 loss to a previously winless Panthers team, but he was also at the helm for a 22-3 upset of the Dallas Cowboys, the high point of the season, before being benched against the Buffalo Bills in Week 17.  His lackluster performance, coupled with a highly publicized DUI arrest, led Ditka to state that the team would not seek to re-sign Collins. The Saints finished 6-10 once again.

In the months before the 1999 NFL Draft, Ditka became enamored with Texas running back Ricky Williams, the Heisman Trophy winner who'd set an NCAA record for career rushing yards with the Longhorns.  Ditka's remarks that he'd "trade his entire draft" for the standout runner were well-publicized; holding the #13 overall pick, the Saints needed to trade up to have a chance at selecting Williams.

They got their chance to do so when the Indianapolis Colts selected Miami running back Edgerrin James with the #4 overall pick. The Saints orchestrated a three-way trade with the Washington Redskins and the Chicago Bears that involved the Saints taking Washington's #5 overall pick – and therefore, Williams – in exchange for all the Saints' remaining 1999 draft picks and their 1st- and 3rd-rounders in 2000.

The trade drew mixed reactions from Saints fans. In the days after the draft, Ditka boldly predicted that the Saints would go to the Super Bowl.

Fan opinion began to solidify against Ditka when it became clear that his prediction would not come true.  The Saints' 1999 season was marked by yet more inconsistency at quarterback, a porous defense, and a hobbled Williams, who struggled with a high ankle sprain and an elbow injury in his rookie year.  The Saints finished 3-13. Owner Tom Benson had had enough; soon after the season ended, he fired Ditka, the entire coaching staff, and general manager Bill Kuharich.

The Ditka era in New Orleans saw seven different starters at quarterback in three seasons (Heath Shuler, Danny Wuerffel, Doug Nussmeier, Billy Joe Hobert, Billy Joe Tolliver, Kerry Collins, and Jake Delhomme) and a defense which went from top-ten to near the bottom of the league in nearly every statistical category.

Jim Haslett era (2000–2005)
To replace Ditka and Kuharich, Tom Benson settled on Randy Mueller, formerly of the Seattle Seahawks, as general manager, and Pittsburgh Steelers defensive coordinator Jim Haslett as head coach.  Mueller shook up the roster, bringing in a squad of fresh talent via free agency: wide receivers Jake Reed and Joe Horn, quarterback Jeff Blake, tight end Andrew Glover, defensive tackle Norman Hand, cornerback Fred Thomas, safety Chris Oldham, and linebacker Darrin Smith, among others.  Lacking their top draft pick because of the Williams trade (a pick the Redskins would use to draft linebacker LaVar Arrington), New Orleans selected defensive end Darren Howard early in the 2nd round.

Inspired by Terrell Davis and the Denver Broncos' offense, new offensive coordinator Mike McCarthy implemented a form of the West Coast Offense with Ricky Williams as the focal point: a run-first attack designed to open up passing lanes and create opportunities for the occasional deep ball.

After a sputtering 1-3 start, the Saints found their groove, winning six straight games	behind Williams and an opportunistic defense.  The 2000 season marked the surprising emergence of Joe Horn, who'd previously been a backup receiver with the Kansas City Chiefs but was flourishing as Blake's main target.

Adversity struck, however, with injuries in consecutive games to Williams and Blake, forcing the team to rely on backups at both positions for the remainder of the season.  Blake's injury presented an opportunity for quarterback Aaron Brooks, who led the team to two critical road wins: an upset over the defending champion St. Louis Rams and a late comeback against the San Francisco 49ers, keeping the Saints atop the NFC West.  A Week 16 victory over the Atlanta Falcons, coupled with a St. Louis loss the following night, gave the Saints a 10-5 record, a playoff berth, and their first division title since 1991.

In the regular season finale, the Saints lost to the Rams, setting up a rematch between the two teams in the wild card playoff round.  Though they lost Horn to an injury early in the game, the Saints managed to surge ahead to a 31-7 lead early in the 4th quarter behind three touchdowns from Brooks to backup wide receiver Willie Jackson.  A late comeback by the Rams was halted in dramatic fashion when St. Louis wide receiver Az-Zahir Hakim fumbled a punt late in the game.  Saints fullback Brian Milne fell on the ball, and New Orleans able to run out the clock to secure its first-ever playoff win.  The final score was 31-28.

The return of Ricky Williams the next week could not prevent the injury-hobbled Saints from losing to the Minnesota Vikings.  Despite the 34-16 loss, the 2000 season was viewed as an overwhelming success by the fans and the media.  Haslett and Mueller were recognized by the NFL as Coach of the Year and Executive of the Year, respectively.  Five Saints were selected to the Pro Bowl: Horn, left tackle Willie Roaf, defensive linemen Joe Johnson and La'Roi Glover, and linebacker Keith Mitchell.  Horn set a franchise record with 1,340 receiving yards and emerged as a playmaker and tenacious possession receiver.  Despite his injury, Williams rushed for 1,000 yards and eight touchdowns in 10 games.

2001

The next five seasons failed to meet the raised expectations of fans and media.  The 2001 season established a trend of team inconsistency from week to week; though the Saints engineered a stirring comeback from several touchdowns down to beat the Rams on the road, they also collapsed at the end of the season, losing their last four games by embarrassing margins to finish 7-9. New Orleans was outscored 160-40 in its final four games and shut out 38-0 by San Francisco in the finale at home in the Saints' final game as a member of the NFC West.

The season was notable for the curious behavior of Albert Connell, a wide receiver acquired in the offseason and intended to be the long-term starter opposite Joe Horn.  Connell was accused of, and subsequently admitted to, stealing over $4,000 from teammate Deuce McAllister, though he claimed the theft was just a prank.  Connell caught only 12 passes in 11 games with the Saints; the team suspended him for the last four games of the season and later terminated his contract.

In the offseason, the Saints – having drafted running back Deuce McAllister in the first round of the 2001 NFL Draft – traded starter Ricky Williams to the Miami Dolphins.  The trade ended up giving the Saints two 1st-round picks.

2002

The 2002 season started with promise (in the now geographically accurate NFC South division) but finished in familiar fashion.  The Saints began the year with impressive wins over three 2001 playoff teams – an overtime win over new division rival Tampa Bay, a 15-point trouncing of Green Bay, and a come-from-behind win over Chicago on the road.  But the season would include a loss to bottom-dweller Detroit, as well as another late-season collapse that included three straight losses to Minnesota, Cincinnati, and Carolina, when a victory in any one of these three games would have all but guaranteed a playoff berth.  The Saints, after starting 6-1, finished at 9-7 and missed the playoffs once again.

Jim Haslett and his coaching staff drew criticism for not benching starting quarterback Aaron Brooks in any of the season's final games.  Brooks had been hobbled by a shoulder injury, and though both he and Haslett insisted the injury would not affect his play, Brooks' performance suggested otherwise.  Over the last six games of the season, Brooks completed only 47% of his passes, throwing for six touchdowns and five interceptions and losing six fumbles.  His passer rating over those six games was 66.7, far less than his 80.1 rating over the entire season.

Backing up Brooks in 2002 was fan-favorite Jake Delhomme, who'd played at nearby UL-Lafayette and had come off the bench to cement a victory over Tampa Bay several weeks earlier.  Brooks' poor performance late in the 2002 season prompted fans to chant "We Want Jake!" at games, but Haslett ignored these chants.  In the offseason, Delhomme signed with Carolina, in part because he'd be able to compete for the starting job.  Delhomme would lead the Panthers to Super Bowl XXXVIII in his first season in Carolina, further rubbing salt in the wounds of Saints fans.

2003

The 2003 season started off poorly for the Saints, going 1-4 in their first five games, including a 55-21 blowout loss at home against the Indianapolis Colts, as Colts quarterback and New Orleans native Peyton Manning threw six touchdown passes to hand the Saints a humiliating loss on national television.  The Saints, however, would rebound somewhat from their poor start and finish the season 8-8.  McAllister ran for a career-high 1,641 yards.

2004

The 2004 season saw the Saints struggle out of the gate. They compiled a 4-8 record in their first 12 games, and Haslett's job appeared to be in jeopardy. Then the Saints put together three straight wins (two of them on the road) to give them a shot at an 8-8 record and a playoff berth. The Saints faced Carolina (also 7-8) in Week 17. The Saints needed to beat the Panthers; they also needed one of two things to happen: a St. Louis tie or loss, or a Seattle win or tie and a Minnesota win or tie.  The New Orleans, St. Louis, and Minnesota games were all played at 1:00 PM EST that Sunday. The Saints defeated the Panthers 21-18, but Minnesota lost to Washington (also by a 21-18 score), meaning that the Saints' playoff chances came down to the game between the Rams and the New York Jets. The game went to overtime with the score tied 29-29. The teams battled back and forth for most of the overtime period. The crucial moment occurred when Jets kicker Doug Brien (formerly of the Saints) missed a 53-yard field goal. The Rams capitalized on the good field position and kicked a field goal of their own to win with a little over 3 minutes left in overtime, sending the Saints out of the playoffs on the tiebreaker scenarios.  Though the Saints had beaten the Rams earlier in the season, their loss to the Vikings and the fact that the Rams did not play the Vikings that season meant that the tiebreaker had to go to the best conference record, where the Rams finished ahead of the Saints and Vikings to claim one of the NFC's wild card spots. The Vikings then got the final wild card spot thanks to their win over the Saints. While the season finished in heartbreaking fashion, many thought that Haslett would have been fired if not for his team's four-game win streak to end the season.

2005 : Hurricane Katrina

Going into the 2005 season, the Saints were optimistic that they could build on their good results at the end of 2004. But when Hurricane Katrina struck, the Saints were thrown into chaos with the rest of their city. The Saints were forced to temporarily relocate their headquarters to San Antonio, Texas. Regardless, they managed to provide an emotional lift for their hometown when they defeated the Panthers 23-20 in Week 1. On September 6, 2005, the NFL decreed that the Saints' first home game would be played in Giants Stadium, adding insult to injury as the Saints were forced to play a "home" game against the Giants in front of a hostile crowd. The Saints struggled and lost 27-10. Fortunately, the NFL announced shortly after that the rest of the Saints' home games would be played either in San Antonio's Alamodome or Baton Rouge's Tiger Stadium. The Saints lost to Minnesota in Week 3, but won in the Alamodome the next week over Buffalo to bring their record to 2-2. They then were upset by the winless Green Bay Packers, 52-3. Furthermore, the Saints suffered heavily due to a season-ending injury suffered by star running back Deuce McAllister.  The Saints would eventually finish the season with a 3-13 record; the last few games of the season saw quarterback Aaron Brooks being benched and released (then signing with the then-Oakland Raiders), giving playing time for backup quarterback Todd Bouman and even third-stringer Adrian McPherson and, eventually, the season ended with head coach Jim Haslett losing his job.

Sean Payton/Drew Brees Era (2006–2022)

2006: Brees and Payton first year

The 2006 Saints orchestrated one of the more remarkable turnarounds in NFL history, as they were the first team to go from 3-13 to a conference title game the next season. First-year head coach Sean Payton, who came from the Dallas Cowboys as a Bill Parcells pupil, was hired for a daunting task at hand. In his first move as coach, he released almost half of the roster, most notably inconsistent quarterback Aaron Brooks.

The Saints were aggressive in free agency, signing former San Diego Chargers quarterback Drew Brees, who had been released after suffering a career-threatening injury to his throwing shoulder during the last game of the 2005 season and was still recovering from surgery at that time. Brees was also being pursued by Nick Saban and the Miami Dolphins but their doctors gave Brees a 25% chance of making a comeback. The Saints gambled on his ability to recover in time for the season and signed him to a major long-term contract. His signing would become a major turning point for the Saints. Then came April, and the 2006 NFL Draft.
 
On the eve before the draft on April 29, news broke that the Houston Texans could not reach an agreement with Reggie Bush and instead reached a deal with defensive end Mario Williams as the #1 pick. When the team found out that Bush would be available, they selected the USC running back with their #2 pick. In that draft, the Saints also picked an unknown player in the 7th-round who would become a standout: wide receiver Marques Colston from Hofstra as the 252nd pick.

When preseason got underway, the Saints started out strong in a victory over the Tennessee Titans, which featured a dazzling run by Reggie Bush where he reversed his direction for a big run. That was the only highlight for the Saints' preseason as they finished just 1–3, losing their other three preseason games.

The 2006 regular season officially began for the Saints with a road win against the Cleveland Browns, with Bush accounting for 129 yards from scrimmage, while Colston caught a touchdown pass from Brees. The next week, the Saints went to Green Bay, where the Saints lost 52-3 the previous year, to face the Green Bay Packers. The start of the game looked bleak for the Saints as they quickly went down 13–0, but Brees led a comeback, throwing for 353 yards and two touchdowns as the Saints came back to win a shootout, 34–27. The Saints then headed back for the first game in the Superdome since the 2005 preseason, a Monday Night date with the Atlanta Falcons on September 25.

The Saints entered the game 2–0 against the 2–0 Falcons with many expecting the Falcons' powerful running game to overwhelm the team. The game kicked off to fanfare of the Saints' official return to New Orleans. The game also featured pregame festivities featuring Green Day and U2 performing a song that would become the team's unofficial anthem, "The Saints Are Coming".  New Orleans dominated the game right from the start when Steve Gleason blocked a punt that was recovered for a touchdown by Curtis Deloatch.  The Saints went on to win 23–3.

The next week, the Saints lost their first game of the season to their division rival, the Carolina Panthers, 21–18. The Saints bounced back in their second game in New Orleans facing their division rival, the Tampa Bay Buccaneers. With time winding down and the Saints down by four, they were set to receive a punt. Reggie Bush returned the punt 65 yards, untouched, for the winning touchdown, and the first of his career. The Saints were 4–1 and in control of the NFC South. A week later, the Saints upset the favored Philadelphia Eagles in New Orleans, 27–24, and the Saints were taken seriously heading into their bye week.

New Orleans entered a midseason slump, losing three of four by Week 10 before going on a three-game win streak. They defeated the Atlanta Falcons, San Francisco 49ers, and Dallas Cowboys in convincing fashion.

The Saints concluded the regular season at 10–6, winning the NFC South title and, for the first time in the team's history, securing a first-round bye in the playoffs.

The Saints' divisional playoff game would be a Week 6 rematch with the Philadelphia Eagles, who were led by backup quarterback Jeff Garcia this time and riding a six-game winning streak. The game featured several lead changes and a most inspired effort by Deuce McAllister, who rushed for almost 150 yards and two touchdowns, one receiving and one rushing.  New Orleans won its first divisional playoff game in team history, 27–24, and only the second playoff win in franchise history.  The Saints then traveled to Chicago to face the Chicago Bears in the team's first ever NFC Championship appearance, where they ended up falling short in the title game, 39–14.

New Orleans led the NFL in total yards gained and passing yards in the 2006 season. Drew Brees set new Saints single-season records in passes completed (356), passer rating (96.2), and passing yards (4,418). The team sent three players to the 2007 Pro Bowl: Brees, defensive end Will Smith, and offensive tackle Jammal Brown.

2007–2008
The 2007 regular season began with a primetime matchup against the defending Super Bowl champion Indianapolis Colts, but the Saints suffered a 41–10 pounding. The losses continued, as the Tampa Bay Buccaneers and Tennessee Titans routed them, followed by a close loss to the Carolina Panthers. The Saints finally managed a victory in Week 6 by defeating the Seattle Seahawks 28–17. After three more victories, they lost two more games, then beat the Panthers, and then fell to the Buccaneers again. In Week 16, the Saints lost to the Philadelphia Eagles, which eliminated them from the playoffs. A loss to the Chicago Bears in the regular season finale ended the Saints' season with a 7–9 record.

In 2008, the Saints began by defeating the Tampa Bay Buccaneers before losing three of the next four games. The Saints were selected for that year's International Series game in London, where they defeated the San Diego Chargers 37–32. The remainder of the season was an uneven string of games, and after being defeated by the Carolina Panthers on December 28, the team ended its 2008 campaign with an 8–8 record.

2009: The Road to Super Bowl XLIV
New Orleans started off 2009 innocently enough with a rout of the hapless Detroit Lions. Afterwards, they traveled to Philadelphia and beat an Eagles team that was missing its starting quarterback, Donovan McNabb, due to an injury.  They accumulated further easy wins over the Buffalo Bills and New York Jets in the next two games. After the bye week, they handily defeated the New York Giants and then beat the Miami Dolphins in a high-scoring affair at Landshark Stadium.  With this impressive win, which featured a second-half rally, the Saints moved to 6–0.  The next four opponents were comparatively weak ones, and the Saints soon found themselves at 10–0 along with the Colts. 
In Week 12, they faced the New England Patriots in the Superdome and inflicted a stunning defeat on the three-time Super Bowl champions.  The Saints nearly lost their next game against the 3–8 Washington Redskins at FedEx Field. The score was tied 30–30 at the end of regulation, and in overtime, Washington almost broke the Saints' eleven-game winning streak. However, a fumble by the Redskins gave the Saints the ball.  They then made a field goal and won the game, 33–30, clinching the NFC South division title.
Afterwards, New Orleans faced the Dallas Cowboys at home and were finally brought down by a 17–24 score.  The next week, the Saints were upset at home by the 2–12 Tampa Bay Buccaneers in overtime. They secured the #1 NFC playoff seed when the 11–3 Minnesota Vikings lost to the Chicago Bears in Week 16. The Saints rested starters during their Week 17 game against the Panthers, finishing their season at 13–3. The re-energized team came back from the first-round bye week and hosted the Arizona Cardinals, crushing them 45–14.  Now in the NFC Championship, the Saints faced the Vikings. The two teams waged an epic struggle through all four quarters.  Minnesota quarterback Brett Favre was hit several times by the New Orleans defensive line, and there were multiple penalties, timeouts, and booth reviews of questionable plays.  Although the Vikings never trailed by more than a touchdown, they could not gain a lead, and as the 4th quarter was drawing to a close, Favre threw an ill-advised pass across the middle of the field, which was intercepted by Saints cornerback Tracy Porter. The game went into overtime, and New Orleans got possession of the ball after winning the coin toss.  Kicker Garrett Hartley made a 40-yard field goal, sending the Saints to Super Bowl XLIV.

The Super Bowl was played in Miami against the Colts, who had won Super Bowl XLI there three years earlier.  Indianapolis jumped out to a 10-0 lead by the end of the 1st quarter. The Saints were unable to score a touchdown in the first half, and instead settled for two long Hartley field goals, making the score 10-6 at halftime.  The 3rd quarter opened with New Orleans executing a surprise onside kick, and both teams got into an argument over who got hold of the ball.  The Saints were ultimately ruled to have recovered it.  A screen pass by Drew Brees to running back Pierre Thomas was good for a touchdown, giving the Saints a 13–10 lead, their first of the game.  After another Colts touchdown, Hartley kicked another field goal to make it a 17–16 game.  The Saints regained the lead with 5:42 remaining in the 4th quarter; a 2-yard touchdown pass from Brees to tight end Jeremy Shockey, followed by a two-point conversion by Lance Moore, made it a 24–17 Saints lead.  On the Colts' ensuing drive, quarterback Peyton Manning was intercepted by Tracy Porter, who returned it 74 yards for the game-clinching touchdown.  A strong defensive effort by New Orleans halted the Colts' attempt at another scoring drive, and the game ended 31–17.  The Saints had finally won a championship after decades of futility, sending the city of New Orleans, and the region, into wild celebrations.

2010–2011
The Saints did not quite live up to their 2009 level of play the following season. Hosting the Vikings in the 2010 season opener, a much-vaunted rematch of the NFC Championship resulted in a meandering 14-9 win, the lowest-scoring victory of Sean Payton's tenure as head coach. After a close win in San Francisco, the Saints went 3-3 down the stretch, as Drew Brees threw several interceptions and Garrett Hartley (the hero of the 2009 postseason) missed multiple field goals that resulted in his being temporarily benched in favor of John Carney, a former Saint who had first played in the NFL back in 1988.  The last remaining active NFL player from the 1980s booted two field goals to help New Orleans beat the 0-3 Carolina Panthers in Week 3.  After a loss to the Cardinals the following week, Carney quit, and the kicking position returned to Hartley.

Overall, the Saints looked sloppy and out of form during the early season, and they suffered their worst loss when the Cleveland Browns beat them at home in Week 7. But after the bye week, the team got back on course and won four games in a row before losing to Baltimore in Week 15. A Monday night matchup with the Atlanta Falcons saw New Orleans win 17-14.  The Saints lost to Tampa Bay 23-13 to end the regular season with a record of 11-5.  New Orleans reached the playoffs, but had to settle for a wild card spot as division rival Atlanta had already locked up the NFC South title and the #1 seed. The #5-seeded Saints headed to Seattle, where their season came to a spectacular end, as the 7-9 Seahawks overpowered the defending champions 41-36.  The game was highlighted a 67-yard touchdown run by Marshawn Lynch, who broke several tackles on the play.

In 2011, New Orleans played in the season opener for the second year in a row, but this time in Green Bay as guests of the defending champion Packers. The Saints struggled, as the Packers quickly marched out to two touchdowns, but regained their composure in a wild shootout. Green Bay never lost their lead however, and went on to win the game 42-34 after stopping Saints rookie running back Mark Ingram II on the 1-yard line as time expired. Opening at home in Week 2, the Saints easily beat Chicago 30-13, then won another shootout against the Houston Texans.  Although New Orleans' defense had performed poorly up to Week 3, the unit got back in sync by limiting Jacksonville to 10 points in a 23-point win the following game.  After beating winless Carolina, Drew Brees threw three interceptions as the Saints lost to Tampa Bay 26-20.  In Week 7, the team hosted Indianapolis in what had been expected to be a rematch of Super Bowl XLIV, but without Peyton Manning, the Colts struggled.  Brees threw 5 touchdown passes as the Saints crushed the Colts, 62-7.  The Saints set a franchise record for most points in a game. However, the Saints reverted to their Week 6 form the following week, as Brees threw two interceptions, and the Saints suffered an astonishing defeat against the winless St. Louis Rams. However, that would prove to be the last loss of the regular season, as the Saints went on an eight-game winning streak to close the season.  They defeated division rivals Tampa Bay and Atlanta, then came out of the bye week to blow out the eventual Super Bowl champion New York Giants 49-24 at home.  The Saints then defeated the Lions 31-17, the Titans 21-17, and the Vikings 42-20.  On Monday Night Football, the Saints hosted the Atlanta Falcons and went on to blow them out, 45-16 and secure the division title.  In that game, Brees broke the NFL's single-season passing yardage record set by Dan Marino 27 years earlier.  The Saints would finish the regular season with a 13-3 record by defeating the Panthers 45-17.  However, the Saints finished behind the defending Super Bowl champion Green Bay Packers and the San Francisco 49ers for the 3rd seed in the NFC playoffs.

In the wild card round of the playoffs, the Saints hosted the Detroit Lions in the Lions' first playoff appearance since 1999.  The Lions got off to a good start, ending the first half with a 14-10 lead, but couldn't keep up with the Saints, who prevailed 45-28.  In the divisional round, the Saints traveled to San Francisco to face the #2-seeded 49ers.  The Saints had trouble against the 49ers' defense, committed five turnovers.  Despite the mishaps, the Saints remained one score behind the 49ers for most of the game.  In a spectacular finish, the lead changed hands four times in the last four minutes, but the Saints lost 36-32, as 49ers quarterback Alex Smith threw a 14-yard touchdown pass to Vernon Davis with nine seconds left to end the Saints' 2011 season.

Bountygate Scandal

On March 2, 2012, the NFL announced the findings of an investigation of a bounty program that former defensive coordinator Gregg Williams and over two dozen defensive players maintained. The program rewarded cash to players for violent hits on opposing players that took place during the 2009–2011 seasons.  Bounties were placed on four specific players: quarterbacks Brett Favre, Cam Newton, Aaron Rodgers, and Kurt Warner.  The NFL hit the Saints hard with punishments.  Williams, who became defensive coordinator with the St. Louis Rams, was suspended indefinitely.  Head coach Sean Payton was suspended for the entire 2012 season.  Although he did not participate in the bounty program, he never told anyone to stop it. General Manager Mickey Loomis was suspended for the first eight regular season games, as he ignored an order from owner Tom Benson to ensure that the program was stopped.  Assistant head coach Joe Vitt (who was named interim head coach during Payton's suspension) was banned for the first six regular season games.  The Saints were also fined $500,000 and stripped of their 2nd-round picks in the 2012 and 2013 NFL drafts. Payton began his suspension April 15 after his appeal was rejected.  Loomis and Vitt also appealed their suspensions, but they were upheld.  The NFL later announced punishments to four current and former Saints players.  Linebacker Jonathan Vilma was suspended for the entire 2012 season; he twice offered $10,000 to anyone who knocked out Warner and Favre in the 2009 playoffs.  Defensive lineman Anthony Hargrove was suspended for the first eight games of the 2012 season. Will Smith was suspended for four games, and Scott Fujita (now with the Cleveland Browns) received a three-game ban.  All of the suspensions were without pay. A grievance was filed on behalf of the suspended players, but it was rejected.  All of the players have appealed to Commissioner Roger Goodell.

2012: Bountygate Punishment
After much negotiation, the Saints re-signed quarterback Drew Brees.  Due to the Bountygate scandal, head coach Sean Payton, as well as some of the defensive players allegedly involved in the scandal, were not allowed to play. They also had to forfeit some of their second-round draft picks for the upcoming 2012 and 2013 NFL Drafts. It was one of the most severe sanctions ever imposed on a team in North American professional sports history. 

The 2012 season began in disappointing fashion with four straight losses to the Washington Redskins, Carolina Panthers, Kansas City Chiefs, and Green Bay Packers.  Then the Saints went on to win five of their next six games, including handing division rival Atlanta its first loss of the season.  After three straight losses to San Francisco, Atlanta, and the defending champion New York Giants, the Saints won two of their last three games, including a 41-0 shutout against division rival Tampa Bay.  The 2012 season ended with a 7-9 record for the Saints, their first losing season since 2007.

The Saints finished 1st in the NFL in passing yards per game and 2nd in overall offense, but they were last in the league in overall defense.

2013
As the team tried to leave the Bountygate in the past, Sean Payton returned to the team as Head Coach following the 2012 season. 2013 prove to be a successful season for the Saints, going undefeated at home and going 11–5, making it into the playoffs as a 6th seed. They manage to win their first road playoff game in franchise history against the Philadelphia Eagles, 26–24. They advanced to 1st seed Seattle Seahawks, getting defeated by the eventual Super Bowl champions 15–23.

2014–2015
2014 was not a memorable year for the Saints. Despite being 2nd in total offense, they went 7–9, with most of the reason for the disappointing season coming from the defense, who ranked 31st in defense that year, turnovers, and inconsistency.  They were eliminated from playoff contention after a 14–30 loss to their divisional rival Atlanta Falcons in the second-to-last week of the regular season.

2015 also proved to be a mostly forgettable year for the Saints.  They finished 7–9 again mainly part to once again having one of the league's worst defenses.

2016: 50th season

The Saints, in their 50th season, despite having the top scoring offense in the league, finished 7-9 for the third consecutive year. This put them in place for the 11th overall pick in the 2017 NFL Draft. They picked Alvin Kamara. Drew Brees threw for over 5,000 yards for the fifth time in his career. Brandin Cooks and Michael Thomas, the 47th overall pick in the 2016 NFL Draft, both had over 1,000 yards receiving. Running back Mark Ingram II broke 1,000 yards rushing for the first time in his career.

2017: Return to the playoffs

Before the season, the Saints acquired longtime Viking and All-Pro running back Adrian Peterson.  However after playing in only four games in which he rushed for 81 total yards, the Saints traded Peterson to the Arizona Cardinals. Alvin Kamara would go on to have a successful rookie season as the Saints finished the year with an 11-5 record to return to the playoffs after a three-year absence.

Minneapolis Miracle 

However, after defeating their division rivals, the Carolina Panthers, in the opening round, the Saints were eliminated from the playoffs after losing to the Minnesota Vikings when a missed tackle allowed Stefon Diggs to score the game-winning touchdown on the final play.

2018

The 2018 season was the first season since 1984 without longtime owner Tom Benson, as he died on March 15, 2018. His wife, Gayle, assumed ownership duties.

The Saints enjoyed another strong season as they finished the year with a 13-3 record and first-round bye. Highlights of this season included Drew Brees surpassing Peyton Manning for most career touchdown passes during a win against the Washington Redskins; he also beat the Ravens for the first time in his career.

NOLA No-Call 

They defeated the defending Super Bowl champion Eagles in the Divisional round, but controversially lost to the Los Angeles Rams, led by 32-year-old head coach Sean McVay, in the title game. Saints fans later cried out against an uncalled pass interference against Rams cornerback Nickell Robey-Coleman call that was a pivotal turning point in the fourth quarter; had the pass interference call been made, the Saints would have likely put the game away by scoring a touchdown, but were forced to settle for a field goal instead, which the Rams easily matched on the next drive to force overtime, in which the Rams won with a field goal. This ruling lead to numerous lawsuits against the NFL from Saints fans and led to a rule change allowing challenge flags to be used on pass interference calls.

2019 

In 2019, the Saints had another year of success. Despite losing Drew Brees for five weeks due to a thumb injury against the Los Angeles Rams in Week 2, the Saints went 5-0 under backup quarterback Teddy Bridgewater. The Saints also participated in one of the highest scoring games in NFL history in Week 14, putting up 46 points and two two-score leads against the San Francisco 49ers, only to lose on a last-second field goal 48-46. Overall, the Saints finished 13-3 and secured their third straight division title. However, despite the Saints acquiring 13 wins, they lost the tiebreakers to the 49ers and Green Bay Packers, who also went 13-3, marking the first time since 2011 where a team got 13 wins but played in the wild card round (ironically, the Saints happened to be both teams).

In the Wild Card Round, the Saints played the Minnesota Vikings, hoping to avenge their divisional loss two years before. Nevertheless, the Vikings would prevail once again, winning a 26-20 overtime contest.

2020: End of an era

The 2020 season for the Saints went back and forth. Despite starting the season 1–2, the Saints acquired nine straight victories, and were soon atop the NFC. One of the biggest surprises of the year was Week 9 against the Buccaneers. The Saints gave Tom Brady the worst loss of his career, a 38–3 shutdown of the Buccaneers. Midseason, however, Drew Brees fell to a rib injury, and had to rest for four games. Backup Taysom Hill went 3–1 during that span, their only loss against the 3–8–1 Eagles. Overall, the Saints went 12–4, and made history for not only completing the first-ever sweep of the NFC South, but sweeping their division for the first time in franchise history.

The New Orleans Saints won their first playoff game in 2 years with a victory over the Bears in the wild card round, 21–9, but, despite sweeping them in the regular season, the Saints then lost to their division rival and eventual Super Bowl champion Buccaneers in the divisional round, 20–30.

That game marked the end of an era as Drew Brees announced his retirement on March 14, 2021, the 15th year anniversary of him signing with the Saints, on Instagram with the help of his children.

2021: Missing the playoffs 
The 2021 season was the Saints' first season without Brees on the roster since 2005. Jameis Winston was named the starting quarterback to begin the 2021 season, but was lost for the season after suffering a torn ACL during a Halloween game against his former team, Tampa Bay. Wide receiver Michael Thomas also missed the entire season recovering from ankle surgery. Highlights from this season included a 38-3 shutout of the Green Bay Packers in Week 1 in Jacksonville because of the devastation of Hurricane Ida, as well as completing another season sweep of the defending champion Buccaneers. The Saints missed the playoffs for the first time since 2016, finishing 9-8.

Post Payton Era (2022-present) 
On January 25, 2022, Sean Payton announced his retirement. During his tenure, Payton became the winningest coach in franchise history. Defensive Coordinator Dennis Allen was named the Saints head coach on February 8, 2022.

References

External links
https://web.archive.org/web/20051105125315/http://www.neworleanssaints.com/custompage.cfm?pageid=66
http://www.profootballhof.com/history/team.jsp?franchise_id=20
http://www.sportsecyclopedia.com/nfl/norleans/saints.html
http://www.pro-football-reference.com/teams/norindex.htm
http://www.nosaintshistory.com

New Orleans Saints
New Orleans Saints